is a city, located in Chiba Prefecture, Japan. , the city had an estimated population of 274,117 in 128,316 households and a population density of 240 persons per km². The city is home, together with the city of Chiba, to the JEF United football club. The whole city is also parts of Greater Tokyo Area.

Geography
Ichihara is located in the western part of the Bōsō Peninsula, and geographically is the largest of Chiba Prefecture's cities and towns.  The south is a mountainous area connected to the Boso hills. The highly industrialized northern part of the city faces Tokyo Bay. Ichihara, dense in housing developments, serves as a satellite town of Tokyo and Chiba City.

Surrounding municipalities
Chiba Prefecture
Chiba
Mobara
Sodegaura
Kisarazu
Kimitsu
Nagara
Chōnan
Ōtaki

Climate
Ichihara has a humid subtropical climate (Köppen Cfa) characterized by warm summers and cool winters with light to no snowfall.

History
The area of modern Ichihara is the center of ancient Kazusa province. The ruins of the Nara period Kazusa Kokubun-ji provincial temple have been found within the borders of Ichihara, although the exact location of the Nara-period provincial capital remains uncertain. During the Sengoku period, the area was contested between the Chiba clan to the north, and the Satomi clan to the south. During the Edo period, the area was divided between Goi Domain, Tsurumaki Domain and large areas of tenryō territory controlled directly by the Tokugawa shogunate and administered by various hatamoto.

Timeline
 During the Meiji period, the area was reorganized into 171 villages under Ichihara District, Chiba Prefecture with the establishment of the modern municipalities system.
 In September 1923, the city was affected by Great Kanto earthquake.
 By 1945, these villages had been consolidated into five towns and 16 villages.
 Through further consolidation and mergers, the city of Ichihara was founded on May 1, 1963.
 On 1 October 1967, the neighboring town of Nansō, and village of Kamo were merged into Ichihara.
 On 11 March 2011, the city was struck by earthquake and tsunami and the subsequent Fukushima nuclear disaster, which causes of the natural gas storage tanks at the Cosmo oil refinery in Ichihara were set on fire by the earthquake.

Government
Ichihara has a mayor-council form of government with a directly elected mayor and a unicameral city council of 32 members. Ichihara contributes four members to the Chiba Prefectural Assembly. In terms of national politics, the city is part of Chiba 3rd district of the lower house of the Diet of Japan.

Demographics
Per Japanese census data, the population of Ichihara has recently plateaued after several decades of strong growth.

Economy
The city's economy is fueled by a large industrial complex overlooking Tokyo Bay. It contains the largest number of oil refineries in Japan, as well as power, petrochemical and shipbuilding companies.

Education
Teikyo Heisei University
Ichihara has 41 public elementary schools and 21 public middle schools operated by the city government, and six public high schools operated by the Chiba Prefectural Board of Education. There are also one private elementary school and two private high schools. The prefecture also operates one special education school for the handicapped.

Transportation

Railway
 JR East –  Uchibō Line
 -  - 
 Keisei Electric Railway – Keisei Chihara Line

 Kominato Railway – Kominato Line
 -  -  -  -  -  -  -  -  -  -  -  -  -  -  -  -

Highway

Sister city relations
 - Mobile, Alabama, United States, from November 10, 1993

Crime and safety
The Soai-kai yakuza syndicate is headquartered in Ichihara. A designated yakuza group, the Soai-kai is the three dominating yakuza syndicates in Chiba Prefecture, along with the Sumiyoshi-kai and the Inagawa-kai.

Notable people from Ichihara

Chiaki, Singer
Neko Hiroshi, Marathon Runner 
Katsushige Kawashima, Boxer
Hirotoshi Ishii, Baseball Player
Kohei Kudo, Soccer Player
Suzuran Yamauchi, Tarento

References

External links

Official Website 

 
Cities in Chiba Prefecture
Populated coastal places in Japan